Panther Run is a  long 2nd order tributary to Anderson Creek in Clearfield County, Pennsylvania.

Course 
Panther Run rises about 5 miles east of Rockton, Pennsylvania, and then flows generally southwest to join Anderson Creek about 1 mile east-southeast of Anderson.

Watershed 
Panther Run drains  of area, receives about 45.5 in/year of precipitation, has a wetness index of 409.87, and is about 97% forested.

See also 
 List of Pennsylvania Rivers

References

Watershed Maps 

Rivers of Pennsylvania
Rivers of Clearfield County, Pennsylvania